Cliff Montgomery (September 17, 1910 – April 21, 2005) was an American football player who served as the captain of the Columbia Lions football team that won the 1934 Rose Bowl Game. Montgomery, the quarterback, called a hidden-ball trick play known as KF-79 that led to Columbia's 7-0 upset over Stanford University. It was widely regarded as one of the greatest athletic upsets of the twentieth century, and Montgomery was named the game's Most valuable player. He went on to play for one season with the National Football League Brooklyn Dodgers.

Montgomery served with the United States Navy during World War II. He earned the Silver Star during the 1945 invasion of Okinawa, credited with saving the lives of 400 sailors on April 6, 1945 when he navigated his flagship alongside a burning destroyer in rough seas.

An executive at McGraw Hill, Montgomery spent 25 years as a college football official and earned a spot in the College Football Hall of Fame.

See also

List of Columbia University people

References

External links
Columbia University obituary for Cliff Montgomery

1910 births
2005 deaths
Recipients of the Silver Star
American football quarterbacks
Columbia College (New York) alumni
Columbia Lions football players
United States Navy personnel of World War II
United States Navy officers

Burials at the Cemetery of the Holy Rood